Barry Graham Wynks  (5 November 1952 – 10 December 2020) was a New Zealand lawn bowler.

Wynks won the silver medal, along with teammates Lynda Bennett and Mark Noble, in the Open para-sport triples event at the 2014 Commonwealth Games. He won another silver medal, along with teammates Mark Noble and Bruce Wakefield, in the Open para-sport triples event at the 2018 Commonwealth Games.

An accomplished table tennis player, Wynks represented the Manawatu centre for many years, and reached the last 32 in the men's singles at the New Zealand table tennis championships in 1972 and 1973. In the 1982 New Year Honours, Wynks was awarded the Queen's Service Medal for community service.

Wynks died on 10 December 2020 at the age of 68.

References

External links
 

1952 births
2020 deaths
New Zealand male bowls players
Bowls players at the 2014 Commonwealth Games
Commonwealth Games medallists in lawn bowls
Commonwealth Games silver medallists for New Zealand
Bowls players at the 2018 Commonwealth Games
Recipients of the Queen's Service Medal
20th-century New Zealand people
21st-century New Zealand people
Medallists at the 2014 Commonwealth Games
Medallists at the 2018 Commonwealth Games